A general election was held in the U.S. state of Mississippi on November 8, 2011. All of Mississippi's executive offices were up for election, as well as legislative elections for the State Senate and House of Representatives. Primary elections were held on August 2, 2011, with runoff elections on the 24th if needed. General election runoffs were held on November 29 if needed. Election results were certified by the Mississippi Secretary of State on December 8.

Governor 

Incumbent Republican Governor of Mississippi Haley Barbour was unable to run for a third term due to term limits. Republican Lieutenant Governor Phil Bryant defeated Democratic Hattiesburg Mayor Johnny DuPree in the general election.

Lieutenant Governor 

Incumbent Lieutenant Governor Phil Bryant did not seek reelection, instead opting to run for the governorship. Republican State Treasurer Tate Reeves defeated Reform Party candidate Tracella Lou O'Hara HIll in the general election.

Reform nomination

Candidate 

 Tracella Lou O'Hara Hill

Republican primary 
Two candidates faced off in the Republican primary, Billy Hewes and Tate Reeves. Reeves, who held a statewide office, had more name recognition and raised more money for his campaign than Hewes, a member in the Mississippi legislature. Both campaigns argued over their records in public office and how much each had contributed to the state's long-term bond debt.

Candidates 

 Billy Hewes, Mississippi State Senator for the 49th district
 Tate Reeves, Mississippi State Treasurer

Results

General election

Results

Secretary of State 

Incumbent Republican Secretary of State Delbert Hosemann sought reelection and won unopposed in the general election.

Republican primary 
Two candidates ran in the Republican primary, Ricky Dombrowski, a Gulfport councilman, and Delbert Hosemann, the incumbent Secretary of State. Dombrowski announced his candidacy after heated discussions with Hosemann over leasing with the Gulfport harbor. Hosemann easily defeated Dombrowski in the primary.

Candidates 

 Ricky Dombrowski, Gulfport City Council President
 Delbert Hosemann, incumbent

General election

Results

Attorney General 

Incumbent Democratic Attorney General Jim Hood decided to run for reelection. He defeated Republican candidate Steven Simpson in the general election.

Democratic nomination

Candidates 

 Jim Hood, incumbent

Republican nomination

Candidates 

 Steve Simpson, Department of Public Safety Commissioner and former circuit judge

General election 
In debates, Simpson challenged Hood on his record in regards to a suit against the Affordable Care Act, the "Personhood" amendment, and Castle Doctrine, while Hood touted his record on lowering domestic homicide, successful lawsuits, and his background. In the general election, Hood won over Simpson, continuing his service as the only Democrat statewide officeholder.

Results

State Auditor 

Incumbent Republican State Auditor Stacey Pickering opted to run for reelection, winning over Reform Party candidate Ashley Norwood.

Reform nomination

Candidates 

 Ashley Norwood

Republican nomination

Candidates 

 Stacey Pickering, incumbent

General election

Results

State Treasurer 

Incumbent Republican State Treasurer Tate Reeves did not seek reelection, instead running for the Lieutenant Governor's office. Republican candidate Lynn Fitch won in the general election over Democratic candidate Connie Moran and Reform Party candidate Shawn O'Hara.

Democratic nomination

Candidates 

 Connie Moran, mayor of Ocean Springs

Results

Reform nomination

Candidates 

 Shawn O'Hara

Results

Republican primary 
Three candidates ran in the Republican primary for Mississippi State Treasurer: Lynn Fitch, Lucien Smith, and Lee Yancey. In the primary, none received a majority of the vote, necessitating a runoff between the two candidates with the highest vote totals. Lynn Fitch and Lee Yancey advanced to the runoff, where Fitch won; she outraised Yancey by $200,000.

Candidates 

 Lynn Fitch, executive director of the Mississippi State Personnel Board
 Lucien Smith, former budget advisor for Governor Haley Barbour
 Lee Yancey, Mississippi State Senator

Results

Runoff

General election

Results

Commissioner of Agriculture and Commerce 

Incumbent Republican Commissioner of Agriculture and Commerce Lester Spell decided not to run for reelection. Republican candidate Cindy Hyde-Smith won in the general election over Democratic candidate Joel Gill and Reform Party candidate Cathy L. Toole.

Democratic nomination

Candidates 

 Joe Gill, Mayor of Pickens

Results

Reform nomination

Candidates 

 Cathy L. Toole

Republican primary

Candidates 

 Cindy Hyde-Smith, Mississippi State Senator
 Max Phillips, retired agriculture educator
 Dannie Reed, Mississippi State House Representative

Results

General election

Results

Commissioner of Insurance 

Incumbent Republican Commissioner of Insurance Mike Chaney ran for reelection, winning over Democratic candidate Louis Fondren and Reform Party candidate Barbara Dale Washer.

Democratic nomination

Candidates 

 Louis Fondren, former Mayor of Moss Point

Results

Reform nomination

Candidates 

 Barbara Dale Washer

Republican nomination

Candidates 

 Mike Chaney

Results

General election

Results

Public Service Commission

Northern district 
Incumbent Democratic Commissioner Brandon Presley ran for reelection, winning against Republican candidate Boyce Adams.

Democratic nomination

Candidates 

 Brandon Presley, incumbent

Results

Republican primary

Candidates 

 Boyce Adams
 Marvin Cox

Results

General election

Results

Central district 
Incumbent Republican Commissioner Lynn Posey ran for reelection, winning against Democratic candidate Addie Green.

Democratic primary

Candidates 

 Addie Green
 Bruce Burton

Results

Republican nomination

Candidate 
 Lynn Posey

Results

General election

Results

Southern district 
Incumbent Republican Commissioner Leonard Bentz ran for reelection, winning against Democratic candidate Mike Collier.

Democratic primary

Candidates 

 Thomas "Tom" Blanton
 James M. Buckhaults
 Mike Collier

Results

Republican primary

Candidates 

 Leonard Bentz
 Travis Rose

Results

General election

Results

Transportation Commission

Northern district 
Incumbent Democratic Commissioner Bill Minor died on November 1, 2010 leading to seven candidates to seek his replacement. Republican candidates John Caldwell Sr. and Mike Tagert received the most votes in the special election, but since neither received a majority, a runoff was scheduled for February 1. Mike Tagert won in the runoff.

Come the November elections for a full-term, Tagert faced off against Democrat Ray Minor. Tagert won in the general election.

Democratic nomination

Candidate 

 Ray Minor

Republican nomination

Candidates 

 Mike Tagert

General election

Results

Central district 
Incumbent Republican Commissioner Dick Hall ran for reelection, winning against Democratic candidate Marshand Crisler.

Democratic primary

Candidates 

 Dorothy Benford
 Marshand Crisler

Results

Republican primary

Candidates 

 Dick Hall
 Tim Johnson

Results

General election

Results

Southern district 
Incumbent Democratic Commissioner Wayne Brown did not seek reelection. Republican candidate Tom King won over Democratic candidate Larry L. Albritton in the general election.

Democratic nomination

Candidate 

 Larry L. Albritton

Republican primary

Candidates 

 Scottie R. Cuevas
 Tom King

Results

General election

Results

References 

2011 Mississippi elections